Neocaledonopsis is a genus of beetles.

Placement
Neocaledonopsis is uncontroversially placed in the tribe Osoriini of the subfamily Osoriinae.

References

External links
 iNaturalist

Staphylinidae genera
Osoriinae